Line J may refer to:

Transit
 Line J, a line on the Metrocable in Medellín, Colombia
 J Line, part of the RapidRide bus system in King County, WA
 J Line (Los Angeles Metro), a bus rapid transit line in Los Angeles County, California
J (Los Angeles Railway), a train line operated 1920–1963
 J Church, a Muni Metro Rail Line in San Francisco, CA
 J Nassau Street Local, part of the J/Z (New York City Subway service)
 Gisors Line J, part of the Transilien Paris-Saint-Lazare

Other
 j-line, a moduli scheme in elliptic curve arithmetic